The Idaho Horsemen are a professional indoor football team based out of Nampa, Idaho, with home games at the Ford Idaho Center. They are owned by Chris Reynolds from Platinum Events & Security LLC. In 2019, the team owners founded the American West Football Conference.

History
The Horsemen were first announced by owner Chris Reynolds in late 2017, with the expressed interest in joining either the Indoor Football League or Champions Indoor Football.  However, due to instability with both leagues, Reynolds took a "wait-and-see approach" before making a decision with the intent to start play in 2019.

On October 15, 2018, the Horsemen announced that they had started their own league, the American West Football Conference, and added three other teams to the league, the Reno Express, the Tri-Cities Fire, and Wenatchee Valley Skyhawks.

On March 23, 2019, the Idaho Horsemen played their first game at the Ford Idaho Center in front of 2054 spectators against the Wenatchee Valley Skyhawks. The Horsemen scored on their first drive in five plays on a run by quarterback Hayden Wright. The Horsemen went on to win 33–22. The Horsemen went undefeated in their first season at 12–0 and earned the right to host the AWFC championship game. They defeated the Reno Express 40–20 to win the league championship.

Prior to the planned start of the 2020 AWFC season, the Tri-Cities Fire folded leading to the Horsemen announcing they would play an independent schedule. The league then tried to move forward with three teams — Idaho, Wenatchee, and the expansion Yakima Canines — following the withdrawal of the Reno Express from the league with non-league teams filling for the newly vacant dates. The AWFC then postponed the 2020 season due to the ongoing COVID-19 pandemic and then cancelled the season entirely due to the unavailability of arenas during the pandemic.

2021 roster

Season-by-season records

References

External links
 Official website
 American West Football Conference website

American football teams in Idaho
American football teams established in 2018
2018 establishments in Idaho
Nampa, Idaho